Celbowo  is a village in the administrative district of Gmina Puck, within Puck County, Pomeranian Voivodeship, in northern Poland. It is located within the ethnocultural region of Kashubia in the historic region of Pomerania.

The village has a population of 505 (31 dec 2010).

History
Celbowo was a royal village of the Polish Crown, administratively located in the Puck County in the Pomeranian Voivodeship. The name of the village comes from the Old Polish male name Żelibor.

During the German occupation of Poland (World War II), in 1942, several Polish families were expelled, while their farms were handed over to German colonists as part of the Lebensraum policy. Poles were either deported to the Lublin District of the General Government or enslaved as forced labour to serve new German colonists in the county.

References

Celbowo